Pandit Santosh Joshi (born July 2, 1960) is an Indian vocalist in the Hindustani classical tradition. He is a member of the Joshi Gharana, a branch of the Lucknow tabla gharana. He is known for the khayal form of singing, as well as for his popular renditions of devotional bhajans and Hori. He is the most recent recipient of the Rajiv Ratna Award of Bikaner.

Early life 
Santosh Joshi was born into a Pushtikar Brahmin family in Bikaner. His father, Shiv Narayan Joshi, was a tabla player of Abid Hussain's Poorab Lucknow Gharana and a student of Suraj Karan Ranga and Pt. Hirendra ganguly (popularly known as Hiru babu Ganguly).

Musical training and career 

Joshi received his tabla training from his elder brother Paramanand Joshi and also started lap (Hawaiian) guitar playing under the guidance of G.D. Jhanwar. He received a degree in vocal music from the Bhatkhande School of Music in Lucknow and from the Indira Kala Sangeet Vishwavidyalaya (I.K.S. University) in Khairagarh. He is also a B-high grade artist of All India Radio. He is especially known for his taans which are produced more intuitively than through deliberation, and for surprising and sudden turns of phrase, for example through the unexpected use of bol taans. Over the years, his repertoire has tended to favor a relatively small number of complex and serious ragas. Some of his more popular ragas include Shuddha Sarang, Kalashree, Madhuvanti, Kirwani, Malkauns, Shankara, Patdeep, Charukeshi, Gorakh Kalyan and Vachaspati. His singing is mostly influenced by musicians such as D.V. Paluskar, Bhimsen Joshi, Rajan-Sajan Mishra, and Ajoy Chakraborty. Joshi assimilated into his own singing various elements that he liked in different musical styles.
Joshi is currently teaching at the Government M.S. College in Bikaner.

References

1960 births
Hindustani singers
20th-century Indian male classical singers
Living people
People from Bikaner
21st-century Indian male classical singers